Rafael Arnal (9 May 1915 – 6 June 2011) was a Venezuelan sports shooter. He competed in two events at the 1952 Summer Olympics.

References

1915 births
2011 deaths
Venezuelan male sport shooters
Olympic shooters of Venezuela
Shooters at the 1952 Summer Olympics
Sportspeople from Caracas